Erich Otto Engel (29 September 1866, in Alt-Malisch Frankfurt – 11 February 1944, in Dachau) was a German entomologist who specialised in Diptera.

He was a graphic artist and administrator of the Diptera collection in Zoologische Staatssammlung München.

Selected works
Engel, E. O. (1925)  Neue paläarktische Asiliden (Dipt.). Konowia. 4, 189-194.
Engel, E. O., & Cuthbertson A. (1934)  Systematic and biological notes on some Asilidae of Southern Rhodesia with a description of a species new to science. Proceedings of the Rhodesia Scientific Association. 34,
Engel, E.O. 1930. Asilidae (Part 24), in E. Lindner (ed.) Die Fliegen der Paläarktischen Region, vol. 4. Schweizerbart'sche, Stuttgart. 491 pp.
Engel, E.O. 1938-1954 Empididae. in Lindner, E. (Ed.). Die Fliegen der Paläarktischen Region, vol.4, 28, 1-400.
Engel, E. O., & Cuthbertson A. (1939).  Systematic and biological notes on some brachycerous Diptera of southern Rhodesia. Journal of the Entomological Society of Southern Africa. 2, 181–185.

References
Anonym 1936: [Engel, E. O.]  Insektenbörse, Stuttgart 53 (37)
Horn, W. 1936: [Engel, E. O.]  Arb. morph. taxon. Ent. Berlin-Dahlem, Berlin 3 (4)	301*
Reiss, F. 1992: Die Sektion Diptera der Zoologischen Staatssammlung München.  Spixiana Suppl., München 17 : 72-82, 9 Abb. 72-75, Portrait

External links
 DEI Portrait

German entomologists
Dipterists
1866 births
1944 deaths